Glaphyromorphus is a genus of lizards in the skink family (Scincidae).

Geographic range
Species in the genus Glaphyromorphus are found in Australia and New Guinea.

Species
The following 12 species are recognized:

Glaphyromorphus arnhemicus (Storr, 1967)
Glaphyromorphus clandestinus Hoskin & Couper, 2004 – Mount Elliot mulch-skink
Glaphyromorphus cracens (Greer, 1985) – slender mulch-skink
Glaphyromorphus crassicauda (A.M.C. Duméril & A.H.A. Duméril, 1851) – Cape York mulch-skink
Glaphyromorphus darwiniensis (Storr, 1967) – Darwin's ground skink, northern mulch-skink
Glaphyromorphus fuscicaudis (Greer, 1979) – brown-tailed bar-lipped skink, grey-tailed skink
Glaphyromorphus mjobergi (Lönnberg & Andersson, 1915) – Atherton Tableland skink
Glaphyromorphus nigricaudis (Macleay, 1877) – black-tailed bar-lipped skink
Glaphyromorphus nyanchupinta  – McIlwraith bar-lipped skink 
Glaphyromorphus othelarrni  – Cape Melville bar-lipped skink
Glaphyromorphus pumilus (Boulenger, 1887) – dwarf mulch-skink
Glaphyromorphus punctulatus (W. Peters, 1871) – fine-spotted mulch-skink

Nota bene: A binomial authority in parentheses indicates that the species was originally described in a genus other than Glaphyromorphus.

References

Further reading
Cogger HG (2014). Reptiles and Amphibians of Australia, Seventh Edition. Clayton, Victoria, Australia: CSIRO Publishing. xxx + 1,033 pp. .
Wells RW, Wellington CR (1984) ("1983"). "A Synopsis of the Class Reptilia in Australia". Australian Journal of Herpetology 1 (3-4): 73–129. (Glaphyromorphus, new genus, p. 95).
Wilson, Steve; Swan, Gerry (2013). A Complete Guide to Reptiles of Australia, Fourth Edition. Sydney: New Holland Publishers. 522 pp. .

 
Lizard genera
Skinks of Australia
Taxa named by Richard Walter Wells
Taxa named by Cliff Ross Wellington